Zhaodong is a city of more than 100,000 inhabitants in southwestern Heilongjiang province, China.

Administrative divisions 
Zhaodong City is divided into 4 subdistricts, 12 towns and 9 townships. 
4 subdistricts
 Chaoyang, Dongsheng, Xiyuanqu, Zhengyangqu
12 towns
 Zhaodong, Changwu, Songzhan, Wuzhan, Shangjia, Jiangjia, Limudian, Sizhan, Laozhou, Wuliming, Liming, Xibali
9 townships
 Taiping, Haicheng, Xiangyang, Honghe, Yuejin, Dechang, Xuanhua, Anmin, Mingjiu

Climate

Zhaodong massacre

On the night of November 18, 1995, a mass shooting occurred in Zhaodong, Heilongjiang. Two suspects, 26-year-old Feng Wanhai and 22-year-old Jiang Liming, armed with a double-barreled shotgun and a small-bore rifle, opened fire at 48 people, killing 32 people and wounding 16 others. 37 families were affected by the incident.
 
Sizhan Town residents Xiao Hongwei and Bai Huichen and their family members (seven people in total) were all killed. The suspects also stole a Type 77 pistol and four Beijing Jeeps. They first drove through Sizhan and opened fire before speeding off to Wuliming Town, located about 30 km northeast of Sizhan. Later, they drove to Xibali Village, located 12 km west of Sizhan, in search of people or "targets", but did not find any. They then drove towards Dechang Village, located north of Sizhan, and stopped at a "Tiancai Stop" along the way looking for people but being unable to find anyone. In order to "do something on a large-scale and let the whole world know" (as described by Jiang, one of the suspects), the two suspects drove around the towns and villages surrounding Sizhan searching for their next "targets".
 
The incident came to the attention of all levels in the Chinese government and security agencies. In Heilongjiang, Secretary of the Provincial Party Committee Yue Qifeng, Provincial Governor Tian Fengshan, Vice Provincial Governor Yang Zhihai, and others, made serious comments about the incident.
 
The Assistant to the Provincial Governor, the Deputy Secretary of the Provincial Party Committee, and Head of Public Security Department Xu Yandong urged the Suihua Administrative Office and the Zhaodong Public Security Department to arrest the suspects at all costs. Deputy Head of Public Security Department Chen Yongcai, Head of Criminal Investigation Department Sun Bangnan, Deputy Head of Criminal Investigation Department Yan Zizhong, and Head of Criminal Technology Department Che Deren led 16 others to the scene to investigate the case. Security agencies all around the country responded quickly and deployed their forces to assist in arresting the suspects.
 
Later that night, at 9:40 pm, Feng Wanhai (26, a farmer from Dongxing Village in Sizhan Town), was shot dead by security forces. Jiang Liming (22, a pharmacy operator from Sizhan Town), was injured and eventually committed suicide by shooting himself after being cornered. It is one of the deadliest rampage killings in modern history and the deadliest mass shooting in Chinese history.

Notable people
Liang Wenbo, snooker player
Wang Guanzhong, People's Liberation Army general

References

External links
Zhaodong Official Website 

 
Cities in Heilongjiang
County level divisions of Heilongjiang
Suihua